Grotellinae is a subfamily of owlet moths in the family Noctuidae. There are about 5 genera and more than 20 described species in Grotellinae. They are found primarily in North and Central America, and are common in the southwestern United States.

As a result of phylogenetic research published in 2019, the subfamily Grotellinae was established when Grotellina, a subtribe of Stiriini, was elevated in rank to subfamily.

Genera
These five genera belong to the subfamily Grotellinae:
 Grotella Harvey, 1875
 Grotellaforma Barnes & Benjamin, 1922
 Hemigrotella Barnes & McDunnough, 1918
 Neogrotella Barnes & Benjamin, 1922
 Podagra Smith, 1902

References

Noctuidae